Michael Coulson may refer to:

 Michael Coulson (barrister) (1927–2002), British barrister, judge and politician
 Michael Coulson (footballer) (born 1988), English footballer